Aytua is a former commune in Pyrénées-Orientales (France).

Geography 
Aytua is located east of the commune of Escaro and northwest of Thorrent, another former commune.

History 
Originally independent, since 20 March 1822, it is linked with Escaro.

Politics and administration

Mayors

Sites of interest 
 Saint-Christine chapel, from the 16th century.

Notes 

Former communes of Pyrénées-Orientales